Patrick Waterhouse (born 13 August 1981) is a British artist. His work involves photography, drawing and graphic design. He has published books of his work and been exhibited internationally. Since 2011 he has been editor-in-chief of Colors magazine. In the same year he won the Discovery Award at Les Rencontres d'Arles for Ponte City, a collaboration with Mikhael Subotzky.

Life and work
 
Waterhouse graduated from Camberwell College of Arts in 2001. After working in London for some years he began a residency at Fabrica research centre in Italy. While at Fabrica he created a fully illustrated version of Dante's Inferno with notation by Walter Hutton, that was published by Mondadori.

In 2007 he and Mikhael Subotzky began a 6 year collaboration photographing and documenting Ponte City Apartments, a 54 story building in Johannesburg, during its failed development and the subsequent aftermath. It won the Discovery Award at Rencontres d'Arles In 2011. Their book Ponte City (2014), published by Steidl, won the Deutsche Börse Photography Prize 2015.

In 2011 Waterhouse became Editor in Chief of Colors magazine. During this time he created a new editorial direction for the publication, the Colors Survival Guides.

Publications
L’Inferno di Dante Luna Storia Naturale. Milan: Mondadori, 2007. . With notation by Walter Hutton.
Ponte City. Göttingen: Steidl; Walther Collection, 2014. . With Mikhael Subotzky, edited by Ivan Vladislavic. 
Catalog of an exhibition held at Le Bal, Paris, Fotomuseum, Belgium in 2014 and Scottish National Portrait Gallery, Edinburgh in 2015.

Colors magazine
 (Australia/New Zealand/UK Edition);  (Hong Kong/Taiwan/China Edition).
Colors 81: Transport - a Survival Guide. Hong Kong: IdN Magazine; Treviso, Italy: Fabrica, 2011.
Colors 82: Shit - a Survival Guide. Hong Kong: IdN Magazine; Treviso, Italy: Fabrica, 2011.
Colors 83: Happiness - a Survival Guide. Hong Kong: IdN Magazine; Treviso, Italy: Fabrica, 2012.
Colors 84: Apocalypse - a Survival Guide. Hong Kong: IdN Magazine; Treviso, Italy: Fabrica, 2012.
Colors 85: Going to Market - a Survival Guide. Hong Kong: IdN Magazine; Treviso, Italy: Fabrica, 2012.
Colors 86: Making the News - a Survival Guide. Hong Kong: IdN Magazine; Treviso, Italy: Fabrica, 2013.
Colors 87: Looking at Art - a Survival Guide. Hong Kong: IdN Magazine; Treviso, Italy: Fabrica, 2013.
Colors 88: Protest - a Survival Guide. Hong Kong: IdN Magazine; Treviso, Italy: Fabrica, 2013.
Colors 89: Moving House - a Survival Guide. Hong Kong: IdN Magazine; Treviso, Italy: Fabrica, 2014.
Colors 90: Football - a Survival Guide. Hong Kong: IdN Magazine; Treviso, Italy: Fabrica, 2014.

Awards
 
 2011: Discovery Award, Les Rencontres d'Arles, with Mikhael Subotzky for Ponte City.
 2015: Deutsche Börse Photography Prize.

Exhibitions

2010:
 Recent Works, Goodman Gallery, Cape Town, 2010 with Mikhael Subotzky.
2011:	
 Appropriated Landscapes, The Walther Collection in Neu Ulm, Germany.
 Transport, Hong Miao Gallery, Shanghai, China.
2012:	
 The Unexpected Guest, Liverpool Biennial, Liverpool.
 Happiness and other survival techniques, Design Museum, London.
 DOC Gallery, Sao Paulo, Brazil. With Projeto Quixote and Unhate Foundation.
2013:	
 A Different Kind of Order, International Center of Photography Triennial, New York.
 My Jo'burg, La Maison Rouge, France.
 L'inferno, Museo di Arte Contemporanea di Cassino (CAMUSAC), Italy.
2014
 Ponte City, Le Bal, Paris, January–April 2014. With Mikhael Subotzky.
 Ponte City, FOMU, Antwerp, June–November 2014. With Mikhael Subotzky.
 Ponte City, The Scottish National Portrait Gallery, December 2014–April 2015.

References

1981 births
Living people